Robert Safford Hale (September 24, 1822 – December 14, 1881) was a U.S. Representative from New York.

Born in Chelsea, Vermont, Hale attended South Royalton (Vermont) Academy, and was graduated from the University of Vermont at Burlington in 1842. He studied law. He was admitted to the bar and commenced practice in Elizabethtown, New York, in 1847. He served as judge of Essex County 1856–1864.

He was elected a Regent of the University of the State of New York in 1859.

In the 1860 presidential election, he was a presidential elector for Abraham Lincoln and Hannibal Hamiln.

He served as special counsel of the United States charged with the defense of the "abandoned and captured property claims" 1868–1870 and as Agent and counsel for the United States before the American and British Mixed Commission under the Treaty of Washington 1871–1873.

Hale was elected as a Republican to the Thirty-ninth Congress to fill the vacancy caused by the death of Orlando Kellogg and served from December 3, 1865, to March 3, 1867.

Hale was elected to the Forty-third Congress (March 4, 1873 – March 3, 1875). He served as chairman of the Committee on District of Columbia (Forty-third Congress).

He was not a candidate for reelection in 1874.

He was appointed a commissioner of the State survey April 29, 1876, in which capacity he was serving when he died in Elizabethtown, New York, on December 14, 1881. He was interred in Riverside Cemetery.

State Senator Matthew Hale (1829–1897) was his brother.

References

External links
  "An Increase of the powers of Congress under the constitution not desirable : speech of Hon. Robert S. Hale of New York in the House of Representatives, February 27, 1866", Samuel J. May Anti-Slavery Collection, Cornell University.
"Annual address to the graduating class of the Law department of Columbian college, Washington, D.C.", by Hon. Robert S. Hale, of New York, June 12, 1872. Columbian University is the former name of George Washington University.

1822 births
1881 deaths
People from Chelsea, Vermont
People from Elizabethtown, New York
University of Vermont alumni
New York (state) state court judges
Regents of the University of the State of New York
Republican Party members of the United States House of Representatives from New York (state)
19th-century American politicians
1860 United States presidential electors
19th-century American judges